Fiorenzuola d'Arda (or ) is a city and comune in Italy in the province of Piacenza, part of the Emilia-Romagna region. Its name derives from Florentia ("prosperous" in Latin). The "d'Arda" portion refers to the River Arda which flows from the Apennines into the valley where Fiorenzuola is situated. Fiorenzuola's origins are old, dating from the first prehistorical human settlements in Italy.

History
Fiorenzuola d'Arda was one of the main centers of the area during the Middle Ages. Under the Duchy of Parma and Piacenza it was a "middle county" independent from both parties.

Main sights
Collegiata of San Fiorenzo, built in the 14th century and remade in the late 15th/early 16th centuries. It was built above the preexisting church of Saint Bonifacio.
Church of Beata Vergine di Caravaggio
Oratory of Beata Vergine
Verdi Theater
Church of St. Francis

Twin towns
 Camagüey, Cuba
 Zenica, Bosnia and Herzegovina
 Laussonne, France

See also
U.S. Fiorenzuola 1922

References

External links

Cities and towns in Emilia-Romagna